William de Aldeburgh, 2nd Baron Aldeburgh (bef. 1358 – 20 August 1391) was a British peer, the son of William de Aldeburgh, 1st Baron Aldeburgh.

Personal life 
Baron Aldeburgh succeeded to his father's peerage as the 2nd Baron Aldeburgh on 1 April 1388. He married Margery, widow of Peter de Mauley of Muigrave, she was the daughter of Thomas Sutton of Sutton. William died on 20 August 1391 without children, thus his barony fell into abeyance. 

He was buried at the church of the Friars Preachers of Yorkshire.

Barons Aldeburgh
14th-century births
1391 deaths
Year of birth uncertain